Richard Lamar Tuten (January 5, 1965 – June 13, 2017)  was an American football punter in the National Football League who played most of his career with the Seattle Seahawks. He punted the ball 108 times in 1992, tied for fourth-most in a season in NFL history. In 1992, he punted for 4,760 yards with an average of 44.1 yards per punt. In 1994, the year he went to his only Pro Bowl, he punted the ball 91 times for 3,905 yards, an average of 42.9 yards per punt, and also scored a two-point conversion, the only scored points of his career. Tuten also received a ring as a member of the St. Louis Rams' Super Bowl championship team. However, he did not play in the game itself due to injury.

While with the Seattle Seahawks in 1998, he won the designation as the league's strongest man pound-for-pound in Flex magazine.

While on vacation with his wife in Costa Rica in 2017, Tuten unexpectedly died at age 52.

Career statistics
Regular season

|-
| style="text-align:center;"| 1989
| style="text-align:center;"| Philadelphia
| 2 || 7 || 256 || 36.6 || 33.6 || 1 || 1
|-
| style="text-align:center;"| 1990
| style="text-align:center;"| Buffalo
| 14 || 53 || 2,107 || 39.8 || 34.2 || 12 || 4
|-
| style="text-align:center;"| 1991
| style="text-align:center;"| Seattle
| 10 || 49 || 2,106 || 43.0 || 36.9 || 8 || 3
|-
| style="text-align:center;"| 1992
| style="text-align:center;"| Seattle
| 16 || style="background:#cfecec;"| 108 || style="background:#cfecec;"| 4,760 || 44.1 || 38.7 || style="background:#cfecec;"|29 || 8
|-
| style="text-align:center;"| 1993
| style="text-align:center;"| Seattle
| 16 || 90 || style="background:#cfecec;"| 4,007 || 44.5 || 37.3 || 21 || 7
|-
| style="text-align:center;"| 1994
| style="text-align:center;"| Seattle
| 16 || 91 || 3,905 || 42.9 || 36.7 || 33 || 7
|-
| style="text-align:center;"| 1995
| style="text-align:center;"| Seattle
| 16 || 83 || 3,735 || style="background:#cfecec;"| 45.0 || 36.5 || 21 || 8
|-
| style="text-align:center;"| 1996
| style="text-align:center;"| Seattle
| 16 || 85 || 3,746 || 44.1 || 34.5 || 20 || 7
|-
| style="text-align:center;"| 1997
| style="text-align:center;"| Seattle
| 11 || 48 || 2,007 || 41.8 || 36.4 || 15 || 5
|-
| style="text-align:center;"| 1998
| style="text-align:center;"| St. Louis
| 16 || 95 || 4,202 || 44.2 || 35.3 || 16 || 10
|-
| style="text-align:center;background:#afe6ba;"| 1999†
| style="text-align:center;"| St. Louis
| 8 || 32 || 1,359 || 42.5 || 34.9 || 9 || 7
|-
|- class="sortbottom" style="background:#eee;"
|style="text-align:center;" colspan="2"|Career
| 141 || 741 || 32,190 || 43.4 || 36.3 || 185 || 67
|}

References

External links

Seattle Seahawks – Seahawks remember former punter Rick Tuten

1965 births
2017 deaths
Ocala High School alumni
American Conference Pro Bowl players
American football punters
Buffalo Bills players
Florida State Seminoles football players
Players of American football from Florida
People from Perry, Florida
Philadelphia Eagles players
Seattle Seahawks players
St. Louis Rams players